Autonomous counties and autonomous banners are county-level autonomous administrative divisions of China. The two are essentially identical except in name.

There are 117 autonomous counties and three autonomous banners. The latter are found in Inner Mongolia Autonomous Region and the former are found everywhere else.

Maps

List

History

Former autonomous counties of China

See also

External links
 ChinaDataOnline.org website 
 BJreview.com: "Regional Autonomy for Ethnic Minorities in China"

 
C

Counties of China
China, PRC Autonomous